Captain North Edward Frederick Dalrymple-Hamilton of Bargany  (17 February 1922 – 8 July 2014) was a Royal Navy officer of World War II who, as gun director of the battleship , witnessed the sinking of the . His father, Frederick Dalrymple-Hamilton, was the commander of the battleship  nearby.

He was later executive officer of the Royal Yacht  from 1958 to 1960.

He was appointed a Deputy Lieutenant of Ayrshire in 1973.

Marriage and family
On 23 July 1949, Dalrymple-Hamilton married the Hon. Mary Helen Colville, daughter of Baron Clydesmuir. The couple had two sons:
 (North) John Frederick Dalrymple-Hamilton OBE b. 7 May 1950 
 James Hew Ronald Dalrymple-Hamilton b. 4 Dec 1955.

Their older son John was a page of honour to the Queen Mother and to Queen Elizabeth II.  He later followed his father in serving as Vice Lord-Lieutenant of Ayrshire and Arran.

References

1922 births
2014 deaths
Royal Navy officers of World War II
Military personnel from Devon
Members of the Order of the British Empire
Ayrshire
Royal Navy officers